The 2010 French Road Cycling Cup is the 19th edition of the French Road Cycling Cup. The 2010 calendar saw a net addition of one race to the calendar to make a 12-round calendar, with the Grand Prix d'Ouverture La Marseillaise and Tour du Doubs being added; the Trophée des Grimpeurs was planned to be the seventh round of the Cup, but was cancelled due to a lack of sponsor and location. Leonardo Duque of  won the overall competition.

Events

2010 French Road Cycling Cup results

1.Grand Prix d'Ouverture La Marseillaise

2.Cholet-Pays de Loire

3.Paris–Camembert

4.Grand Prix de Denain

5.Tour du Finistère

6.Tro-Bro Léon

7.Grand Prix de Plumelec-Morbihan

8.Polynormande

9.Châteauroux Classic

10.Tour du Doubs

11.Grand Prix d'Isbergues

12.Tour de Vendée

External links
  Coupe de France Standings

French Road Cycling Cup
French Road Cycling Cup
Road cycling